Los Olivos may refer to:
 Los Olivos District, Peru
 Los Olivos, California, United States
 Los Olivos, Los Santos, Panama